The RMT Bateleur (named for the bird species) is a German ultralight and light-sport aircraft, designed by Andre von Schoenebeck and produced by RMT Aviation of Bad Bocklet. The aircraft is supplied as a kit for amateur construction or as a complete ready-to-fly-aircraft.

Design and development
The aircraft was designed by von Schoenebeck as his first full-sized aircraft after a career of designing competition model gliders. The Bateleur was intended to comply with the Fédération Aéronautique Internationale microlight rules and US light-sport aircraft rules. The company also plans to type certify it to FAR 23 standards.

The Bateleur features a delta wing layout with a canard. The wing is a cantilever low-wing design. The aircraft also features two-seats-in-tandem under separate bubble canopies, fixed or optionally retractable tricycle landing gear and a single engine in pusher configuration.

The aircraft is made from composites. Standard engines available are the  Rotax 912ULS and the turbocharged,  Rotax 914 four-stroke powerplants. Landing gear is fixed for the US light-sport aircraft market or retractable for the homebuilt version.

Production was initially established in South Africa, moved to Germany, and finally to the United States in 2012.

As of March 2017, the design does not appear on the Federal Aviation Administration's list of approved special light-sport aircraft.

Specifications (Bateleur)

References

External links

2000s German ultralight aircraft
Homebuilt aircraft
Light-sport aircraft
Single-engined pusher aircraft
Canard aircraft